J.D. Lifshitz (born October 13, 1992) is an American film director, producer, screenwriter and occasional actor.

Biography
He is co-founder of the independent Production company BoulderLight Pictures Inc. In 2009 he began to work on his directorial debut the psycho-thriller Killed on the Fourth of July, as well as working on Tim Sullivan's 2001 Maniacs: Field of Screams and Brothers of the Blood as associate producer. He also starred in a supporting role in Chillerama. Liftshitz produced 2012 the thriller Contracted and 2015 his sequel Contracted: Phase II.

 
He is Orthodox Jewish.

Filmography 

Actor
 Killed on the Fourth of July (2010)
 Chillerama (2011)

Producer
 2001 Maniacs: Field of Screams (2010)
 Brothers of the Blood (2010)
 Contracted (2013)
 Contracted: Phase II (2015)
 Dementia (2015)
 Uncaged (2015)
 Weep (2016)
 Rent-A-Pal (2020)
 Barbarian (2022)

References

External links
 

1992 births
Living people
American Ashkenazi Jews
American film directors
American male actors
American male screenwriters
Film producers from New York (state)
People from Great Neck, New York
People from Uniondale, New York
Screenwriters from New York (state)